Allium heteronema is a plant species endemic to Sichuan in China. It grows on hillsides at elevations of 1600–2300 m.

Allium heteronema has bulbs about 1 cm across. Scapes are up to 30 tall. Leaves are about the same length as the scape. Umbel has only a few bluish-purple flowers.

References

heteronema
Onions
Flora of China
Flora of Sichuan
Plants described in 1980